Sir Henry Byam Martin KCB (25 June 1803 – 9 February 1865) was a senior Royal Navy officer, and a watercolour artist.

Naval career 
Martin was born in 1803, the second son of Admiral of the Fleet Sir Thomas Byam Martin, comptroller of the navy (1815–1831). Educated at the Royal Naval Academy, Martin first went to sea in October 1818. Martin took part in actions off Tartus, and the capture of Acre on 3 November 1840. His actions earned him an appointment as a Commander of the Order of the Bath.

Martin was promoted to Rear-Admiral in 1854 and was appointed as a Knight Commander of the Order of the Bath for his work during Crimean War in 1855.

Artist 

During his travels with the Navy Martin sketched and painted what he had seen.

Family 
His elder brother William Martin also became a senior naval commander.

References

Further reading
 
 

1803 births
1865 deaths
Royal Navy admirals
English watercolourists
Knights Commander of the Order of the Bath
Artists from Plymouth, Devon
British military personnel of the Egyptian–Ottoman War (1839–1841)
19th-century British painters
Military personnel from Plymouth, Devon